Charles James Louis Gilson, who published as Captain Charles Gilson and Major Charles Gilson and Barbara Gilson (1878–1943) was a British officer and a popular author of science fiction, adventure stories, and historical fiction books for children. Some of his stories were illustrated including at least one book, The Refugee; the Strange Story of Nether Hall, by Arthur E. Becher. Cyrus Cuneo also illustrated his writing. His fiction included works about the Pygmies of the Upper Congo. He also depicted Boxer Rebellion era adventures. Some of his stories were serialized in magazines. Many of his stories are available online through resources such as Project Gutenberg.

Gilson served in China after the Boxer Rebellion and featured China in some of his stories. Gilson featured a Chinese detective in one of his stories. He wrote young adult fiction and was praised for his "wide knowledge of the world" in his portrayals. His stories were also published in magazines for youth such as The Captain and St. Nicholas Magazine. Another of his works featured the exploits of Jerry Abershaw. He also produced an account of Robin Hood.

The Spectator reviewed his book The Lost Column in 1908.

Bibliography
The Silver Shoe
The Law of Natural Healing (1905)
The Lost Island: A Strange Tale of Adventure in the Far East (1910)
The Refugee: the Strange Story of Nether Hall with illustrations by Arthur E. Becher (1910)
The Pirate Aeroplane (1913)
Certain Passages in the Life of Mr Wang (1914)
Across the Cameroons: A Story of War and Adventure
Treasure of Kings
Submarine U93 illustrated by George Soper
The Fire-Gods: A Tale of the Congo
The Pirate Yacht, an Amazing Yarn of Modern Pirates (1918)
The Lost City: Being the Authentic Account of Professor Miles Unthank of the Search for the Sarcophagus of Serophis, and the Theft of the Mystic Scarab, Formerly in the British Museum (1920)
Held by Chinese Brigands (1920)
Jugatai, the Tartar (1920)
The Boy's Own Annual Volume 43 (1921) with L. R. Brightwell illustrated by C. Gifford Ambler; L.R. Brightwell; George Soper; et al.
The Realm of the Wizard King: A Romance of Central Africa (1922)
Wizard King: A Romance of Central Africa (1922)
The Realm of the Wizard King: A Romance of Central Africa (1922)
The Lost City (1923)
The Boy's Own Paper (1923)
The Lost Column; A Story of the Boxer Rebellion in China (1924)
The Treasure Of The Red Tribe (1926) published by Cassell & Co
Mystery island (1928) published by S.W. Partridge
The City of the Sorcerer (1934)
The Cat and the Curate: A Phenomenal Experience (1934)
Queen of the Andes (1935) as Barbara Gilson 
Robin of Sherwood
Wolfskin
Raja Dick (1948) published by Oxford University Press

References

External links

1943 deaths
1878 births
20th-century British male writers
British children's writers
British science fiction writers
British historical fiction writers
British Army personnel of the Boxer Rebellion
British Army officers